For the Melkite theologian, see Theodore Abu Qurrah

Abu Qurra a member of the Sufrite tribe Banu Ifran of Tlemcen, was the founder of the indigenous Berber Muslim movement with Kharijite tendencies in North Africa after the overthrow of the Umayyad dynasty. Between 767 and 776, Abu Qurra organised an army of more than 350,000 riders in the north of Africa. He was the first head of state of the Berber Muslim Maghreb. Ibn Khaldun described him in his book Kitab El Ibar.

References

8th-century Berber people
Berber rulers
Berber Muslims
Kharijites
Ifranid dynasty
8th-century monarchs in Africa